Moritz Landé (2 March 1829 in Ostrowo – 23 June 1888 in Berlin, Germany) was a German architect of Jewish origin. Landé was born in the Prussian Province of Posen. He was the son of Löbel Landé, a merchant from Ostrowo. Initially educated at his home under the supervision of a private teacher, he continued his studies as a master mason in Breslau. Finally he moved away to live with his uncle Jacob Landé, who was an architect. In 1857 he married Sophie Block (1 September 1835 – 23 June 1913).

Moritz Landé designed and oversaw the construction of The New Synagogue in Ostrow Wielkopolski (1857–1860). After 1864 the Landés moved to Berlin. There he designed a house for his family. Moritz Landé died in 1888 in Berlin, Germany, and is buried, together with his wife Sophie on Europe's largest Jewish cemetery in Berlin's Eastern borough Weißensee.

The last residence of Moritz Landé was at Wilhelmstrasse 143 in Berlin whereas his wife had her last residence at Kurfürstenstrasse 99 a in Berlin.

The burial of Sophie Landé was initiated by her son Otto, whose profession/function was noted as director.

References 

19th-century German Jews
19th-century German architects
1829 births
1888 deaths
People from Ostrów Wielkopolski
People from the Province of Posen
Jewish architects